The... is the debut extended play by South Korean boyband JYJ (then using the name Junsu/Jejung/Yuchun), a group formed of three of the five members of TVXQ. A Japanese-language EP, it was released under Rhythm Zone, the band's former Japanese label as a part of TVXQ. The release was commercially successful, reaching number one on Oricon's weekly albums chart.

The DVD featured rehearsal footage for their Thanksgiving Live in Dome concerts.

Individual song charting 

Prior to the album's release, the Thanksgiving Live in Dome live versions of the four tracks were released as digital downloads. During this release, the songs charted on RIAJ's Digital Track Chart, with "W" ranking at #19, "Itsudatte Kimi ni" at #20, "Get Ready at #66 and "Long Way" at #80. When the studio versions of the songs were released in September as digital downloads, "Itsudatte Kimi ni" peaked at #35 and "W" at #48, however the other two songs or the remixes did not chart.

Track listing

Chart rankings

Reported sales and certifications

Release history

References

2010 debut EPs
Avex Group EPs
JYJ albums
Japanese-language EPs